Lake Claire is the largest lake which is entirely in Alberta, Canada. It is located entirely in Wood Buffalo National Park, west of Lake Athabasca. It lies between the mouths of Peace River and Athabasca River, and is part of the Peace-Athabasca Delta system.

It is the largest lake located entirely within Albertan boundaries. Lake Athabasca, which straddles the border with Saskatchewan, is larger.

The lake is fed by Birch River and McIvor River, and the lake system also contains Baril Lake and Mamawi Lake. The waters are discharged in the Peace River, finding their way to the Arctic Ocean through the Slave River, Great Slave Lake and Mackenzie River.

See also
Lakes of Alberta

References

Claire
Wood Buffalo National Park